Hagested Church is a Church of Denmark parish church situated in the little village of Hagested, adjacent to Hagestedgård, between Holbæk and Nykøbing Sjælland, some  west of Copenhagen, Denmark.

History
Hagested Church was constructed in the second half of the 12th century. In 1540, Hagestedgård was ceded to Johan Friis in exchange for other land. On 16 September, Hagested was also ceded to him on condition that he would always see to it that the parish had a parish priest. In 1909, Hagested Church gained its independence.

Church frescos
Jacob Kornerup was responsible for the uncovering and restoration of Romanesque frescos in the apse and on the triumphal wall in 1862. It is believed that they were created by the Jørlunde Workshop (1150–1175), which was associated with the Hvide family. More frescos were discovered on the north wall of the chancel in connection with a renovation of the church in 1973.

Furnishings

The triptych altarpiece is from the Late Gothic period. The pulpit is from c. 1659. There is a Romanesque baptismal font.

Churchyard
Notable burials in the churchyard include:
  (17821865), military officer
  (18791963), politician and editor

References

External links

 Hagested Parish

Churches in Holbæk Municipality
12th-century establishments in Denmark